The Sumathi Best Television Commercial Award is presented annually in Sri Lanka by the Sumathi Group of Companies associated with many commercial brands for the best Sri Lankan television commercial of the year in television screen.

The award was first given in 1995. The award was given to the three best commercial advertising in each year for three advertisements. Following is a list of the winners of this prestigious title since then.

References

Sumathi Awards